Something Wicked was a quarterly horror, science fiction, and fantasy print magazine published in South Africa  by InklessMedia Publishing. The magazine was founded by Joe Vaz in 2006. Their first issue was published in the Spring of 2006. In July, 2011, it switched to a monthly on-line format.

References

External links
 Something Wicked - Official site and Forum.
 Subscription via Weightless Books - 12 Month electronic subscriptions.

2006 establishments in South Africa
2011 disestablishments in South Africa
Defunct magazines published in South Africa
Fantasy fiction magazines
Horror fiction magazines
Magazines established in 2006
Magazines disestablished in 2011
Online magazines with defunct print editions
Quarterly magazines
Science fiction magazines
Magazines published in South Africa
Monthly magazines published in South Africa
English-language magazines published in South Africa